Achradocera is a genus of flies in the family Dolichopodidae. It is distributed in the Nearctic and Neotropical realms as well as in Polynesia. Several Afrotropical species were also placed in the genus, but in 2018 they were transferred to Chrysotus. Achradocera was formerly considered a subgenus of Chrysotus, but was restored as a separate genus by Harold E. Robinson (1975).

Species
Achradocera apicalis (Aldrich, 1896)
Achradocera arcuata (Van Duzee, 1924)
Achradocera barbata (Loew, 1861)
Achradocera chilensis (Van Duzee, 1930)
Achradocera contracta (Van Duzee, 1929)
Achradocera edwardsi (Van Duzee, 1930)
Achradocera excavata (Van Duzee, 1924)
Achradocera femoralis Becker, 1922
Achradocera fractus Meijere, 1913
Achradocera insignis Parent, 1933
Achradocera longiseta Parent, 1933
Achradocera meridionalis Becker, 1922
Achradocera porrectus Parent, 1939
Achradocera shannoni (Van Duzee, 1930)
Achradocera tuberculata (Van Duzee, 1931)

The following species are synonyms or have been moved to other genera:
Achradocera africana Parent, 1934: now Chrysotus africanus (Parent, 1934)
Achradocera angustifacies Becker, 1922: synonym of A. barbata (Loew, 1861)
Achradocera ealensis Parent, 1936: now Chrysotus ealensis (Parent, 1936)
Achradocera insularis Lamb, 1933: now Chrysotus insularis (Lamb, 1933)
Achradocera insularis Parent, 1933 (homonym of above): synonym of Chrysotus insularis (Lamb, 1933)
Achradocera rutshuruensis Vanschuytbroeck, 1951: now Chrysotus rutshuruensis (Vanschuytbroeck, 1951)
Achradocera wulfi Parent, 1936: now Chrysotus wulfi (Parent, 1936)

References

Dolichopodidae genera
Diaphorinae
Diptera of North America
Diptera of South America
Insects of Oceania
Taxa named by Theodor Becker